Thomas Lacey (born 22 September 1993) is an Australian actor, singer and dancer. He is best known for his role as Benjamin "Ben" Tickle, a dance student, on the ABC television series Dance Academy.

Personal life 
Thomas has been dancing since the age of two, first dancing at May Downs School of Dance. Thomas has training in ballet, tap, jazz, contemporary, hiphop, ballroom and acrobatics. He was also believed to be doing international music styles at a young age such as Croatian, Japanese and other countries in the middle east.

Thomas started dating fellow May Downs School of Dance alumni, Georgia Hayden, in roughly 2017. The pair took over control of the dance school in late 2018 and became engaged in 2019. They married January 8th 2022 (https://www.instagram.com/tv/CYiwoJ0JnOK/

Career 
In 2011, Thomas landed the Role as Benjamin "Ben" Tickle in Dance Academy. Most recently, Lacey is playing the lead male role in the Musical theatre version of Strictly Ballroom.

Filmography

References 

1993 births
Living people
21st-century Australian male actors
Australian male television actors